Signals for Tea is a 1995 album by composer, musician and arranger Steve Beresford which was released on the Japanese Avant label.

Reception

The Allmusic review by Brian Olewnick stated "While generally enjoyable, a bit of sameness sets in after a while; the lyrics maintain interest, but the themes begin to blend into one another. The disc is worth hearing, however, if only to hear a side of the jazz avant-garde normally kept under wraps".

Track listing
All compositions by Steve Beresford and lyrics by Andrew Brenner
 "All My Fibres" – 4:01  
 "Rent" – 4:17  
 "Unremarkable" – 5:44  
 "Signals for Tea" – 4:16  
 "Approximate Song" – 3:31  
 "Let's Get Cynical" – 3:43  
 "Good Morning" – 6:50  
 "The 3 Doors" – 6:06  
 "Elephants" – 4:05  
 "Little Window" – 4:30  
 "The Agony of You" – 3:40  
 "Good Morning (Solo Version)" – 3:15  
 "Speed Limit" – 8:33  
 "Unremarkable (Solo Version)" – 3:43

Personnel
Steve Beresford – piano, vocals
John Zorn – alto saxophone backing vocals
Dave Douglas – trumpet, backing vocals
Greg Cohen – bass, backing vocals
Kenny Wollesen – drums, backing vocals

References

1995 albums
Steve Beresford albums
Avant Records albums
Albums produced by John Zorn